Sir John Orr  (3 September 1945 – 19 February 2018) was a senior police officer and the Chief Constable of Strathclyde Police between 1996 and 2001.

Early life and education
Orr was born in Kilmarnock in Ayrshire. He graduated from Open University, and also received a Diploma in Forensic Medicine from the University of Glasgow.

Police career
John Orr first joined the police as a cadet in 1961 at Renfrew and Bute Constabulary. As Detective Chief Superintendent of Strathclyde Police, he was appointed Senior Investigating Officer of the Lockerbie disaster which occurred on 21 December 1988. This was the biggest single murder investigation in the history of Scottish policing.

In 2001, Orr was knighted by the Queen for his services to Scottish policing.

After retirement
In 2001 he was appointed chairman of Kilmarnock Football Club. He remained as chairman until his resignation in 2003, when he was appointed as Honorary President.

In 2005 Sir John reported on his "Review of Marches and Parades in Scotland" which was to be formalised through the Scottish Parliament to provide a framework for legal protocols of marches and parades within Scotland.

He died on 19 February 2018.

References

1945 births
2018 deaths
British Chief Constables
Officers in Scottish police forces
Scottish police officers
Knights Bachelor
Officers of the Order of the British Empire
Scottish recipients of the Queen's Police Medal
Alumni of the Open University
Alumni of the University of Glasgow
People from Kilmarnock
Chairmen and investors of football clubs in Scotland
Kilmarnock F.C. non-playing staff
20th-century Scottish businesspeople